The 1969 Idaho Vandals football team represented the University of Idaho in the 1969 NCAA University Division football season. The Vandals were led by second-year head coach Y C McNease and played in the Big Sky Conference. After two seasons in the College Division, Idaho returned to the University Division this year.

Due to soil erosion, the wooden grandstands at 32-year-old Neale Stadium in Moscow were deemed unsafe in early August. Without a usable stadium on campus, they played their three home games at Rogers Field at Washington State University in nearby Pullman, Washington.

Despite playing their home games in Pullman, the Vandals did not play the WSU Cougars in the Battle of the Palouse. Outside of war years, it was the first break in the rivalry since 1900; Idaho did not field a team in 1918 (World War I) and neither did in 1943 & 1944 (World War II). WSU had to adjust its schedules to include all seven conference foes; the rivalry resumed in 1970 but was skipped again in 1971.

In their ninth meeting with Idaho State, the Vandals incurred their first loss to the Bengals in the home opener in Pullman. Without a game in Boise on the schedule (first time since 1946), the Vandals did not play in the state of Idaho this season; this occurred again thirty years later in 1999.

Idaho had four starting quarterbacks in 1969: Steve Olson was first-string, backed up by John Hathaway, both from Lewiston. Hampered by back problems, Olson started the first four and Hathaway the next four, until a shoulder injury. Mitch Lansdell started the ninth game but an ankle injury sidelined him late in the fourth quarter. Fourth-string Pete Glindeman was slated to redshirt and had been lining up in practices as a defensive end. He relieved Lansdell and started the last game, a ten-point loss in which he threw seven 

A day after the season ended, the south grandstand of idle Neale Stadium was burned in an apparent arson. Less than five months later, a similar fire occurred at Rogers Field in April 1970. Also a suspected arson, it severely damaged the south grandstand and press box of the

Schedule

Roster

All-conference
Wide receiver Jerry Hendren was a repeat selection to the all-conference team, again unanimously. He was joined by linebackers Roosevelt Owens and Ron Linehan, the lone

NFL Draft
Three Vandals were selected in the 1970 NFL Draft, which lasted seventeen rounds (442 selections).

List of Idaho Vandals in the NFL Draft

References

External links
Gem of the Mountains: 1970-71 University of Idaho yearbook – 1969 (& 1970) football seasons
Go Mighty Vandals – 1969 football season
Idaho Argonaut – student newspaper – 1969 editions

Idaho
Idaho Vandals football seasons
Idaho Vandals football